Guillermo Coria and David Nalbandian were the defending champions, but they did not compete in the Juniors this year.

Dominique Coene and Kristof Vliegen defeated Andrew Banks and Benjamin Riby in the final, 6–3, 1–6, 6–3 to win the boys' doubles tennis title at the 2000 Wimbledon Championships.

Seeds
The top 5 seeds received a bye into the second round. 

  Lee Childs /  James Nelson (semifinals)
  Hiroki Kondo /  Lu Yen-hsun (second round)
  Todor Enev /  Radoslav Lukaev (quarterfinals)
  Karol Beck /  Michal Kokta (semifinals)
  Tres Davis /  Adam Kennedy (quarterfinals)
  Dumiso Khumalo /  Raven Klaasen (first round)
  Dominique Coene /  Kristof Vliegen (champions)
  Oscar Posada /  Cristian Villagrán (first round)

Draw

Finals

Top half

Bottom half

References

External links

Boys' Doubles
2000